The 16th running of the Omloop Het Nieuwsblad women's race in Belgium was held on 27 February 2021. Widely regarded as the start of the Classics season, it was a 1.Pro event on the women's international calendar. The race followed a similar route to that of the men's race, but was shorter and more straightforward at only , starting in Ghent and finishing in Ninove. For the first time, the women's race finished an hour after the men's race, allowing for the final hour to be broadcast live on television.

Teams 
Twenty-four teams, made up of all nine UCI Women's WorldTeams and fifteen UCI Women's Continental Teams, participated in the race. Each team entered a squad of six riders for a total of 144 riders, of which 111 finished.

UCI Women's WorldTeams

 
 
 
 
 
 
 
 
 

UCI Women's Continental Teams

Result

See also
 2021 in women's road cycling

References

External links

2021
Omloop Het Nieuwsblad
Omloop Het Nieuwsblad
Omloop Het Nieuwsblad
Omloop Het Nieuwsblad